Zal Batmanglij  (Persian: زال باتمانقلیچ; born on April 28, 1981) is an American film director and screenwriter. He directed and co-wrote the 2011 film Sound of My Voice and the 2013 film The East, both of which premiered at the Sundance Film Festival, as well as the Netflix series The OA, which debuted in 2016.

Early life and education
Batmanglij was born in 1981 in France to Iranian parents and grew up in Washington, D.C. His mother, Najmieh Batmanglij, is a cookbook author; his father is a book publisher. His younger brother Rostam was a founding member of the band Vampire Weekend. Both brothers are gay.

Batmanglij studied anthropology and English at Georgetown University, graduating in 2002. At Georgetown he met Mike Cahill in a philosophy class. They took a screenwriting course together and co-directed a short film that won the Georgetown Film Festival. Brit Marling saw the film and asked if she could work with them. Several years later, following Marling's graduation, the three friends moved to Los Angeles, California, where Batmanglij attended the AFI Conservatory. For his thesis film, he made a 35mm short called The Recordist (2007), which starred Marling.

Career 
In 2011, Batmanglij's debut feature, Sound of My Voice, co-written with Marling, premiered at the Sundance Film Festival. Shortly thereafter, Fox Searchlight Pictures purchased Sound of My Voice, as well as Batmanglij and Marling's next feature script, The East. Batmanglij also directed The East, starring Marling, Elliot Page, and Alexander Skarsgård. The film premiered at Sundance in 2013.

Batmanglij and Marling collaborated to create drama series The OA, which debuted in 2016 on Netflix. It was written by Marling and Batmanglij, who produced the series along with Dede Gardner and Jeremy Kleiner of Plan B, and Michael Sugar of Anonymous Content.

Filmography
Film
The Recordist (2007) – short film – writer, director
Sound of My Voice (2011) – feature directorial debut – co-writer, director
The East (2013) – co-writer, director

Television
Wayward Pines, episodes "Our Town, Our Law", "One of Our Senior Realtors Has Chosen to Retire" (2015) – director
The OA (2016–2019) – writer, director
Retreat – writer, director

Awards and nominations

References

External links

American male screenwriters
American writers of Iranian descent
LGBT people from Washington, D.C.
American gay writers
American LGBT screenwriters
LGBT film producers
LGBT film directors
LGBT television directors
Gay screenwriters
Georgetown College (Georgetown University) alumni
AFI Conservatory alumni
American LGBT people of Asian descent
Film directors from Washington, D.C.
Screenwriters from Washington, D.C.
Living people
1981 births
French emigrants to the United States